Guglielmo Trinci (born August 25, 1959) is a retired Italian professional baseball first baseman. He played for the Italy national baseball team in the 1984 Summer Olympics, while baseball was a demonstration sport, and in the 1992 Summer Olympics.

External links

1959 births
Baseball players at the 1992 Summer Olympics
Olympic baseball players of Italy
Living people
Place of birth missing (living people)
Baseball players at the 1984 Summer Olympics
20th-century Italian people